Tragia durbanensis, the stinging nettle creeper, is a twining herb in the family Euphorbiaceae, with a restricted distribution in southern Africa. There are some 150 species in the genus Tragia.

Distribution and habitat
It is native to the coastal areas of Mozambique and eastern coastal areas of South Africa. These plants are found in dune forest, in woodland and on forest margins.

Description
A much-branched climbing perennial herb, with twining stems up to 2.5 m originating from a woody rootstock. The leaves are hairless or thinly hairy with serrated margins. The hairs sting fiercely. Inflorescences are up to 5.5 cm long with peduncles up to 2 cm long. The inflorescences are composed mostly of tiny male flowers with 1–2 female flowers below or else all male.

Synonyms
Tragia capensis E.Mey. ex Sond. [Illegitimate name]
Tragia glabrata (Müll.Arg.) Pax & K.Hoffm. [Illegitimate name]
Tragia glabrata var. hispida Radcl.-Sm.	
Tragia meyeriana var. glabrata Müll.Arg.

Ecological significance
This species is one of the larval foodplants of four species of butterfly; Eurytela hiarbas, Eurytela dryope, Byblia ilithyia and Byblia anvatara.

Gallery

References

durbanensis